James A. Wright (June 17, 1873December 21, 1911) was an American businessman and politician from the U.S. state of Wisconsin.  He was a member of the Wisconsin Senate, representing much of northern Wisconsin from 1905 until his death in 1911.

Biography
Born in Racine, Wisconsin, Wright moved with his family to Merrill, Wisconsin. He went to the Merrill public schools. Wright then went to Dixon Business College and the Northern Illinois State Normal School. He was involved with his family's lumber business in Merrill, Wisconsin: H. W. Wright Lumber Company. In 1904, Wright organized the Wisconsin Lumber Company in Littell, Washington. Wright was also involved with the banking business. From 1905 until his death in 1911, Wright served in the Wisconsin State Senate and was a Republican. Wright died of typhoid fever at his home in Merrill, Wisconsin.

References

External links

1873 births
1911 deaths
People from Merrill, Wisconsin
Politicians from Racine, Wisconsin
Northern Illinois University alumni
Businesspeople from Wisconsin
Republican Party Wisconsin state senators
19th-century American politicians
19th-century American businesspeople
Republican Party members of the Wisconsin State Assembly
Burials in Wisconsin